Anna Thottam is a village in the Papanasam taluk of Thanjavur district, Tamil Nadu, India.

Demographics 

As per the 2001 census, Athur Thottam had a total population of 184 with 90 males and 94 females. The sex ratio was 1044. The literacy rate was 62.18.

References 

 

Villages in Thanjavur district